Powerloom Workers Union, a trade union of powerloom workers in Andhra Pradesh, India. PWU is affiliated to the All India Trade Union Congress. The president of PWU is S. Mallesham.

Trade unions in India
All India Trade Union Congress
Textile and clothing trade unions